Augsburg is a city in Germany.

Augsburg may also refer to:

Places
Augsburg, Arkansas, a small town in the United States
Augsburg, Illinois, an unincorporated community
Prince-Bishopric of Augsburg, a prince-bishopric (principality ruled politically by a prince-bishop) of the Holy Roman Empire that belonged to the Swabian Circle

Education
Augsburg University, in Minneapolis, Minnesota, USA
University of Augsburg, in Augsburg, Germany

Organizations
FC Augsburg, a German football club
Grand Alliance (League of Augsburg), a European coalition during the late 17th century
Augsburg Airways, a now defunct German airline

Religion
Augsburg Confession, a Lutheran church document
Augsburg Fortress, the publishing house of the  Evangelical Lutheran Church in America (ELCA)
Augsburg Fortress Canada, the publishing for the Evangelical Lutheran Church in Canada (ELCIC)

Ships
  (cruiser):  4,400 ton  light cruiser, launched 1909
 :   (Type 120) frigate, commissioned 1962 to 1988
 :   (Type 122) frigate

See also
Willard S. Augsbury (1858–1939), New York politician